Maurice "Moose" McGrath (October 1, 1916July 7, 1968) was an American tackle for Buffalo Indians. He played college football at Niagara University.

He died from injuries suffered in a car accident when his car struck a bridge abutment.

References

Buffalo Indians players
Niagara Purple Eagles football players
1916 births
1968 deaths
American football tackles